Aspergillus asperescens is a species of fungus in the genus Aspergillus. It is from the Nidulantes section. The species was first described in 1954. It has been isolated from soil from a cave in England.

Growth and morphology
A. asperescens has been cultivated on both Czapek yeast extract agar (CYA) plates and Malt Extract Agar Oxoid® (MEAOX) plates. The growth morphology of the colonies can be seen in the pictures below.

References 

asperescens
Fungi described in 1954